Belz Enterprises, Inc. is a major American-based developer of hotels, retail, and commercial properties, including shopping malls.

Belz owns and operates the Peabody Hotel in Memphis. Previously they operated two other Peabody Hotels, one in Little Rock, and another in Orlando, however both of these hotels were sold in 2013 becoming a Hyatt and Mariott respectively. In past years, much of its operations have been centered on the development of new factory outlet-type malls and the conversion of some its older traditional properties into such. In recent years they have developed more traditional shopping centers including strip malls and Peabody Place in downtown Memphis, commercial office, and warehouses space.  The firm is based in Memphis. Ronald A. Belz serves as Chief Operating Officer.

History
The company was founded in North Memphis in 1940 by Philip Belz (1904-2000). The firm's earliest projects included small retail and residential spaces and soon expanded to industrial development, starting with a roofing materials factory on the former site of the North Memphis Driving Park (horse racing track).

References

External links
Belz Enterprises Website

Shopping center management firms
Companies based in Memphis, Tennessee
Real estate companies established in 1940